The 1992–93 South-West Indian Ocean cyclone season lasted longer than normal, with the first storm Aviona forming on September 27 and the final storm Konita not dissipating until May 7. It was an above-average season, with four tropical cyclones – the equivalent of a minimal hurricane – along with six tropical storms, one subtropical depression, and several depressions including one that was named. The basin is defined as the area west of 90°E and south of the Equator in the Indian Ocean, which includes the waters around Madagascar westward to the east coast of Africa. Tropical cyclones in this basin are monitored by the Regional Specialised Meteorological Centre in Réunion (MFR), as well as by the Joint Typhoon Warning Center (JTWC).

At the time, the season officially went from November 15, 1991, to April 30, 1992, although this season began in September with the formation of Tropical Storm Aviona in the northeastern portion of the basin. A month later, Tropical Storm Babie also formed in the northeastern portion of the basin before the season's official start. After several depressions formed in December and early January, Cyclone Colina formed and struck Réunion, which damaged houses and killed 2 people and left 12 missing there. Three storms were active at the same time in the middle of January, including Colina – Tropical Storm Dessilia moved across Madagascar with gusty winds, and Cyclone Edwina was the longest-lasting and strongest storm of the season. Edwina brushed the Mascarene Islands with gusty winds and light rainfall. In mid-February, Tropical Storm Finella brought locally heavy rainfall to Réunion, reaching  along the island's east coast and causing minimal rainfall along the southern coast. The Intertropical Convergence Zone (ITCZ) became active toward the end of February, spawning tropical storms Gracia and Ionia as well as Tropical Depression Hutelle. Ionia, the last of five system to cross Madagascar during the season, killed eight people in the country. The season ended with Cyclone Jourdanne, which was the second-strongest storm of the season in April, and Cyclone Konita in May.

Seasonal summary 

During the season, the Météo-France office (MFR) on Réunion island issued warnings in tropical cyclones within the basin. The agency estimated intensity through the Dvorak technique, and warned on tropical cyclones in the region from the coast of Africa to 90° E, south of the equator. The Joint Typhoon Warning Center (JTWC), which is a joint United States Navy – United States Air Force task force, also issued tropical cyclone warnings for the southwestern Indian Ocean. The storms in the season lasted about five days on average, although Cyclone Edwina lasted the longest at 11 days. Storms formed throughout the basin and were fairly evenly distributed throughout the season, with the exception of a lull in November. Most storms originated from the Intertropical Convergence Zone (ITCZ). MFR named storms throughout the season using 11 names from a sequential list. The remainder of the list was Laura, Monette, Neige, Octavie, Pamela, Rosita, Stella, Tasiana, Vigonia, Wendy, and Yolande.

Systems

Moderate Tropical Storm Aviona 

On September 25, a low-pressure area persisted between the Cocos Islands and Sumatra in the Australian region, east of 90° E. It moved southwestward into the south-west Indian Ocean due to a large ridge to the south. The system slowly organized, becoming a tropical disturbance on September 27; on the same day, the JTWC also initiated advisories on the system as Tropical Cyclone 01S. This marked an unusual event of such an early storm formation. On September 29, the system was named Moderate Tropical Storm Aviona, although the MFR later assessed that the system reached tropical storm status on the previous day. When Aviona was named, the MFR estimated peak 10-minute sustained winds of 75 km/h (45 km/h). Subsequently, increased wind shear incurred weakening due to a trough to the south, which stripped the convection from the center. A building ridge behind the trough turned Aviona to the west. The storm weakened to a depression on October 1, the same day the JTWC discontinued advisories. The circulation continued generally west-southwestward until dissipating on October 5 to the north of Rodrigues island.

Moderate Tropical Storm Babie 

Convection quickly organized around a center, and a tropical disturbance formed on October 18. On the same day, the JTWC began issuing warnings on the system as Tropical Cyclone 02S. A trough to the south steered the system to the south-southwest. A building ridge to the south increased wind shear, causing Babie to quickly weaken; the JTWC and MFR discontinued advisories on October 21, and the circulation dissipated on October 23.

Tropical Cyclone Colina 

The ITCZ spawned an area of convection on January 11 near the Chagos Archipelago. A large ridge to the south steered the system generally to the southwest. The disturbance intensified into a depression on January 14, the same date that the JTWC initiated advisories on Tropical Cyclone 10S, and following an increase in convection, the depression intensified into Moderate Tropical Storm Colina on January 15. Turning more to the south-southwest, Colina strengthened further into a tropical cyclone on January 18, developing a  eye. That day, the eye crossed over the western portion of Réunion at around 14:30 UTC, exiting 45 minutes later. Subsequently, Colina accelerated to the southeast over cooler waters, weakening in the process. On January 20, the cyclone weakened to tropical storm status, and the next day Colina became extratropical, dissipating two days later.

Early in its duration, Colina dropped rainfall in Seychelles through the interaction with the ITCZ. The rains caused flooding and mudslides, and the storm also produced high waves and gusty winds. Moving across Réunion, Colina produced strong wind gusts in the mountainous peaks, reaching  at La Plaine-des-Palmistes. The winds and rainfall damaged crops and houses and also caused power outages. The storm killed two people on the island during its passage, with 12 others missing.

Severe Tropical Storm Dessilia 

While Colina was intensifying northeast of Réunion, the monsoon spawned an area of convection in conjunction with a low-pressure area in the Mozambique Channel. On January 16, the system developed into a tropical disturbance, although initially the circulation was poorly-defined. It moved toward the coast of Mozambique before turning southeastward and organizing more. At around that time, Dessilia made landfall on northwestern Madagascar between Morondava and Morombe. Over a 30-hour period, the storm moved southeastward across the country, remaining fairly well-organized. Initially, it appeared that Colina absorbed Dessilia once the latter storm emerged from the Madagascar coastline, although they remained separate systems. After having weakened to tropical depression status, Dessilia restrengthened into a tropical storm on January 22. Increased wind shear weakened the convection, and the storm dissipated on January 24; the next day, the remnants were absorbed by a passing cold front.

Wind gusts on Madagascar reached  at Morombe. Later, the storm produced  waves to the southwest coast of Réunion.

Intense Tropical Cyclone Edwina 

A few days after Colina formed, the ITCZ spawned another area of convection on January 16 in the northeast portion of the basin. The next day, a low-pressure area formed between the Chagos Archipelago and Diego Garcia, and on January 19 the system developed into a tropical disturbance after convection increased. Following further organization, the system intensified into Tropical Storm Edwina on January 20 while moving generally westward. Increasing wind shear prevented significant strengthening initially, but Edwina was able to intensify more on January 21. On January 23, the JTWC upgraded the storm to the equivalent of a minimal hurricane on the same day that MFR upgraded Edwina to tropical cyclone status. Around that time, the cyclone turned more to the south around a large ridge, maintaining peak winds through January 27. By that time, the eye became large and ragged while passing halfway between Rodrigues and St. Brandon. On the next day, increased wind shear caused marked weakening, quickly destroying the eye and lowering the winds below tropical cyclone force. On January 29, Edwina ceased existing as a tropical system, although its remnants persisted several more days, affecting Île Amsterdam in the south-central Indian Ocean on February 2.

Moderate Tropical Storm Finella 

A large low-pressure area persisted on February 11 across northern Madagascar, centered near Cape Masoala along the country's eastern coast. Moving southward and later southeastward due to a trough, the system developed into a tropical disturbance on February 12 and slowly organized. On the next day, the JTWC began tracking the system as Tropical Cyclone 19S. The MFR upgraded the system to Tropical Storm Finella on February 14 after an eye feature developed within the central dense overcast. Increased wind shear weakened Finella, and it was no longer a tropical depression on February 15.

Finella produced localized heavy rainfall in Réunion. Saint-Benoît along the east coast recorded  of precipitation in 24 hours, including  that fell in just one hour. The southern portion of the island received minimal rainfall, in contrast.

Moderate Tropical Storm Gracia 

A circulation within the ITCZ developed on February 20 just south of Mayotte in the Mozambique Channel. It developed good outflow and showed initial signs of development, although on February 21 the system weakened. The convection reorganized, developing a ragged eye with circular rainbands, and the system intensified into Tropical Storm Gracia on February 22. It was a small system, just 100 km (60 mi) from the Madagascar coast when it attained tropical storm status. Shortly thereafter, the convection rapidly disintegrated as Gracia made landfall on northwestern Madagascar near Besalampy, dissipating early on February 23. The storm produced locally heavy rainfall, reaching  where it made landfall. The JTWC did not track the system.

Moderate Tropical Storm Ionia 

The ITCZ remained active in early March, spawning a tropical depression in the northern Mozambique Channel on March 2. It failed to organize at first, although an increase in convection on March 3 allowed the system to strengthen into Tropical Storm Ionia. After passing about 50 km (30 mi) north of Juan de Nova island, Ionia progressed southeastward and approached the western Madagascar coastline. The circulation paralleled the coast for about  before moving ashore at Belo on March 4. The storm weakened over land, re-emerging over open waters on March 5 from southeastern Madagascar. Ionia briefly re-intensified into a tropical depression that night, but it lost tropical characteristics on March 7. The remnants persisted several more days until dissipating south of the Mascarene Islands on March 11.

The fifth depression of the season to move across Madagascar, Ionia dropped heavy rainfall, reaching 356 mm (14 in) in some areas; this caused river flooding in southern Madagascar. The storm left 3,644 people homeless and killed eight.

Intense Tropical Cyclone Jourdanne 

After a period of inactivity lasting slightly less than a month, the tropics became active again in early April when the ITCZ spawned an area of convection in the northeastern portion of the basin. This was in association with a preexisting low-pressure area, and developed into a tropical disturbance on April 2. On the next day, the JTWC began tracking the system as Tropical Cyclone 24S. The system moved to the west-southwest due to a ridge to the south, gradually intensifying due to favorable conditions, such as warm water temperatures. On April 4, the system intensified into a tropical storm and was given the name Jourdanne. An eye developed on April 5, indicating that the storm attained tropical cyclone status. Although the convection was initially elongated, Jourdanne became much more symmetrical on April 6, which corresponded to its peak 10-minute intensity of  that day. Due to a trough in the region, Jourdanne executed a small loop and turned to a southeast drift. Gradually increasing wind shear induced weakening, causing the eye to dissipate on April 7. On the next day, Jourdanne weakened below tropical cyclone intensity, and on April 9, the convection was stripped from the center. By the next day, Jourdanne was no longer a tropical disturbance, although its remnants persisted April 15.

Tropical Cyclone Konita 

A low-pressure area formed on April 29 to the southeast of the Chagos Archipelago with an area of convection, but it failed to organize into a tropical disturbance until May 2. By that time, the JTWC was already classifying it as Tropical Cyclone 26S, and the system gradually organized while moving southwestward. Despite being late in the season, the system intensified into Tropical Storm Konita on May 4, and the next day attained tropical cyclone status. By the time of peak intensity, Konita was moving more to the south into an area of weak steering currents. A trough northwest of the storm caused the convection to rapidly diminish, leaving the center exposed from the thunderstorms on May 6. After moving erratically to the northeast and looping, Konita dissipated on May 7. The storm did not directly affect land, although it indirectly caused an increase of rainfall over Seychelles.

Other systems 

In addition to the 11 named storms, one of which failed to attain tropical storm status, there were several additional systems. The first was Tropical Depression C1, that originated from the ITCZ in the northeastern portion of the basin from a small area of convection on November 24. It moved westward with pulsating convection around the center, failing to organize due to the presence of wind shear. Increased wind shear weakened the convection, and the circulation dissipated on December 10. On December 18, a tropical low developed in the Australian basin northeast of the Cocos Islands. It moved southwestward, intensifying into a tropical storm and being named Ken by the BoM. Wind shear in the region prevented much development, and the storm crossed into the south-west Indian Ocean on December 21. At that time, the MFR classified the system as Tropical Depression C2, but the agency only issued two warnings. The JTWC tracked the system until December 23 when the system dissipated well to the southwest of Indonesia.

On December 24, a cold front exited the southern African coastline, accompanied by a low-pressure area that moved into the Mozambique Channel. The system produced a large area of convection, and with warm water temperatures in the area, the low gradually organized. On December 26, the MFR began tracking the system off the southwest coast of Madagascar. Around that time, the convection began to wrap into the center, while the system produced gale-force winds on Europa Island. The storm tracked generally to the southeast, passing south of Madagascar while intensifying gradually. Due to the structure, the storm was considered a subtropical depression. The subtropical storm continued to the southeast until December 30, when an approaching trough absorbed it.

After the subtropical depression dissipated, there were three additional depressions before Tropical Cyclone Colina developed on January 11. The ITCZ became active toward the end of February. On February 24, Tropical Disturbance H1 formed from a low-pressure area to the west of Réunion. It moved quickly to the southeast, intensifying into a tropical depression, but dissipating on February 26 when it was absorbed into a trough. A day later, another disturbance formed near Réunion, which produced torrential rainfall, reaching  in some locations. The system moved westward, intensifying into a tropical depression after further organization. Despite not being a tropical storm, the system was named Hutelle by the Meteorological Service of Madagascar on March 1. Shortly thereafter, Hutelle made landfall near Mahanoro, Madagascar, and dissipated the next day.

Season effects 
This table lists all the cyclones that developed in the Indian Ocean, during the 1993–94 South-West Indian Ocean cyclone season. It includes their intensity, duration, name, landfalls, deaths, and damages.

|-
| Avoina ||  || bgcolor=#| || bgcolor=#| || bgcolor=#| || None ||  ||  || 
|-
| Babie ||  || bgcolor=#| || bgcolor=#| || bgcolor=#| || None ||  ||  || 
|-
| Colina || January 13–20 || bgcolor=#| || bgcolor=#| || bgcolor=#| || Seychelles, Mauritius, Reunion || || 14 ||
|-
| Dessilia || January 16–24 || bgcolor=#| || bgcolor=#| || bgcolor=#| || Juan de Nova Island, Madagascar || || ||
|-
| Edwina || January 19–29 || bgcolor=#| || bgcolor=#| || bgcolor=#| || Rodrigues, Mauritius, Reunion || || ||
|-
| Finella || February 12–15 || bgcolor=#| || bgcolor=#| || bgcolor=#| || Reunion || $5.9 million || ||
|-
| Gracia || February 20–23 || bgcolor=#| || bgcolor=#| || bgcolor=#| || Madagascar || || ||
|-
| Hutelle || February 27 – March 2 || bgcolor=#| || bgcolor=#| || bgcolor=#| || Madagascar || || ||
|-
| Ionia || March 2 – March 7 || bgcolor=#| || bgcolor=#| || bgcolor=#| || Madagascar || || 8 ||
|-
| Jourdanne || April 2–10 || bgcolor=#| || bgcolor=#| || bgcolor=#| || || || ||
|-
| Konita ||  || bgcolor=#| || bgcolor=#| || bgcolor=#| || None ||  ||  || 
|-

See also 

 List of Southern Hemisphere tropical cyclone seasons

 Atlantic hurricane seasons: 1992, 1993
 Pacific hurricane seasons: 1992, 1993
 Pacific typhoon seasons: 1992, 1993
 North Indian Ocean cyclone seasons: 1992, 1993

Notes

References 

 
South-West Indian Ocean cyclone seasons
Articles which contain graphical timelines